The 2017 CAA women's soccer tournament was the postseason women's soccer tournament for the Colonial Athletic Association held from October 29 through November 5, 2017. The tournament quarterfinals were held at campus sites, while the semifinals and final took place at Hofstra University Soccer Stadium in Hempstead, New York. The six-team single-elimination tournament consisted of three rounds based on seeding from regular season conference play. The defending champions were the Northeastern Huskies, but they failed to defend their title, losing 2–1 to the Hofstra Pride in the final. The conference tournament title was the fourth for the Hofstra women's soccer program and the third for head coach Simon Riddiough.

Bracket

Schedule

First Round

Semifinals

Final

Statistics

Goalscorers 

 3 Goals
Hannah Rosenblatt – Northeastern

 2 Goals
 Nicole Gorman – Northeastern
 Lucy Porter – Hofstra

 1 Goal
 Elysse Branton – William and Mary
 Jenn Buoncore – Hofstra
 Haley Crawford – Northeastern
 Ginger Deel – Northeastern
 Emily Evangelista – Northeastern
 Sami Grasso – William and Mary
 Lizzie George – Northeastern
 Kylie Hegemier – James Madison
 Mackenzie Kober – William and Mary
 Hannah Lopiccolo – Northeastern
 Rachel Moore – William and Mary
 Kerri Zerfoss – Northeastern

See also 
 Colonial Athletic Association
 2017 CAA Men's Soccer Tournament

References 

Colonial Athletic Association women's soccer tournament
2017 Colonial Athletic Association women's soccer season